Leptoderma lubricum is a species of slickheads found in the Western Pacific Ocean.  

References

Alepocephalidae
Taxa named by Tokiharu Abe
Fish described in 1965